Kumho Tire Co. v. Carmichael, 526 U.S. 137 (1999), is a United States Supreme Court case that applied the Daubert standard to expert testimony from non-scientists.

Background 
Patrick Carmichael was driving his minivan on July 6, 1993, when the right rear tire blew out.  One of the passengers in the vehicle died, and others were severely injured.  Three months later, the Carmichaels sued the manufacturer of the tire, claiming that the tire was defective and the defect caused the accident.  The Carmichaels' case rested largely on testimony from a tire failure expert.  

The tire failure expert relied on features of tire technology that the manufacturer did not dispute, as well as background facts about the particular tire on the Carmichaels' van.  The expert's conclusion that a defect in the tire caused the accident rested on certain observations about the tire that Kumho Tire vigorously disputed.  Kumho also disagreed with certain aspects of the tire expert's methodology, and asked the federal district court hearing the case to exclude it under Rule 702 of the Federal Rules of Evidence.  

The district court took its cue from Daubert v. Merrell Dow Pharmaceuticals, which had solidified a gatekeeping role for trial judges in admitting expert testimony.  Under Daubert, certain factors contribute to the reliability, and hence the admissibility, of expert testimony, one of which is the general validity of the expert's methods.  The district court found the tire expert's methods not to be scientifically valid, and hence excluded his testimony.  This resulted in a conclusion that Kumho Tire would prevail.  The Carmichaels appealed to the Eleventh Circuit.

The Eleventh Circuit reversed the district court's ruling.  It reasoned that Daubert was expressly limited only to scientific expert testimony and did not apply to "skill- or experience-based observation."  The tire expert's testimony rested on such unscientific "observation and experience", and so the Eleventh Circuit reasoned the district court should have made a different ruling based on their legal reasoning over Rule 702 without the Daubert gloss.  Kumho Tire asked the Supreme Court to review whether Daubert applied solely to scientific evidence.

Majority opinion
The Court found in the text of Rule 702, a codification of Daubert, a gatekeeping function for federal trial judges who had to determine whether expert scientific testimony was admissible in a federal trial.  But Rule 702 applies to "scientific, technical, or other specialized knowledge."  "This language makes no relevant distinction between 'scientific' knowledge and 'technical' or 'other specialized' knowledge."  Although Daubert dealt only with scientific knowledge, that was the nature of the case, and it did not stray beyond the facts of that case.

The Court observed that the line between "scientific" and "technical" knowledge is not always clear.  "Pure scientific theory itself may depend for its development upon observation and properly engineered machinery.  And conceptual efforts to distinguish the two are unlikely to produce clear legal lines capable of application in particular cases."  If the line between "scientific" and "technical" knowledge was not clear, then it would be difficult for federal trial judges to determine when they were to perform Daubert'''s gatekeeping function and when to apply some other threshold test the Court might craft for applying Rule 702.  Furthermore, the Court saw no "convincing need" to draw a distinction between "scientific" and "technical" knowledge, because both kinds of knowledge would typically be outside the grasp of the average juror.  Accordingly, the Court held that the gatekeeping function described in Daubert applied to all expert testimony proffered under Rule 702.Daubert had mentioned four factors that district courts could take into account in making the gatekeeping assessment—whether a theory has been tested, whether an idea has been subjected to scientific peer review or published in scientific journals, the rate of error involved in the technique, and even general acceptance, in the right case.  In the context of other kinds of expert knowledge, the Court conceded, other factors might be relevant, and so it allowed district judges to take other factors into account when performing the gatekeeping function contemplated by Daubert.  These additional factors would, of course, depend on the particular kind of expert testimony involved in a particular case.  Equally as important, because federal appeals courts review the evidentiary rulings of district courts for abuse of discretion, the Court reiterated that district courts have a certain latitude to determine how they will assess the reliability of expert testimony as a subsidiary component of the decision to admit the evidence at all.

Applying that standard to the evidence proffered by the Carmichaels' tire expert, the Court concluded that the district court correctly refused to admit the expert's testimony.  The district court had to determine whether the tire expert's methods could reliably determine what had caused the tire on the Carmichaels' van to explode.  The expert's experience as a tire engineer wasn't the problem—the expert had worked for ten years at Michelin.  The fact that visual inspection of tires was generally a reliable method wasn't an issue either, because the issue before the court was specific to the tire on the Carmichaels' van.  But the expert said that his inspection of the tire led to the conclusion that a defect caused the tire to explode because he did not see evidence of other causes.  "Nothing in either Daubert or the Federal Rules of Evidence requires a district court to admit opinion evidence that is connected to existing data only by the ipse dixit'' of the expert [i.e., only by the statement of the expert himself]."  The district court acted within its discretion to exclude the evidence proffered by the tire expert in light of these concerns.  Accordingly, the Supreme Court reversed the Eleventh Circuit's decision to overrule the district court.

See also
 List of United States Supreme Court cases, volume 526
 List of United States Supreme Court cases
 Lists of United States Supreme Court cases by volume

External links
 
  Northwestern University School of Journalism
  Brief of the Solicitor General
  Amicus Brief, Washington Legal Foundation

United States expert witness case law
Federal Rules of Evidence case law
United States Supreme Court cases
United States Supreme Court cases of the Rehnquist Court
Tires
1999 in United States case law
Kumho Asiana Group